Ming Chuan University (MCU) is a private university in Shilin District, Taipei, Taiwan, accredited in the United States of America  and by AACSB. Ming Chuan University was ranked in the 451-500 range in QS Top Asia Universities Ranking 2022  and positioned 1501+ in 2023 by Times Higher Education ranking. It was founded by Pao Teh-Ming (包德明) and her husband Lee Ying-Chao. The university was named after the progressive Qing Dynasty governor of Taiwan Liu Mingchuan.

History
Ming Chuan University was founded in 1957 by Dr. Teh-Ming Pao and Dr. Ying-Chao Lee. It was Taiwan's first women's business school. Dr. Teh-Ming Pao, its first president, had the most significant influence on its development. When the government had just moved to Taiwan and the economy was lagging, with an urgent need to nurture business professionals, Dr. Pao founded the school in the interests of national development, at the same time raising awareness of the talents and rights of women and facilitating their contributions to society. She began preparations in Fall 1956 and on March 25, 1957, the Ministry of Education approved its founding. It began operation the following Fall.

The original plan called for Ming Chuan to be located in Danshui. However, a descendant of Liu Ming-Chuan, Madam Liu, was having difficulty maintaining Ming Chuan Orphanage that she had established on Zhong-Shan North Road. She found Dr. Pao willing to take over Ming Chuan Orphanage, which was later converted into the school of the same name. In five years following its establishment the school was twice moved and rebuilt, finally being relocated to its present site in the Shihlin District in 1962. Dr. Pao borrowed funds so that construction could be completed all at once.

Since MCU began as a commercial college, the original three-year day school consisted of three programs: Banking and Insurance, Accounting and Statistics, and International Trade and Business Administration. In 1960, Secretarial Science was added and Ming Chuan became part of the national junior college joint entrance examination program. The former four departments were formed into an evening program added in 1963. In 1964, the day school added a Commercial Mathematics department and Secretarial Science was added to the evening program. A five-year program for junior high school graduates was established in the same year and grew to an enrollment of 1400. The Ministry of Education of the ROC promoted Ming Chuan to senior college status on July 16, 1990.

After more than 30 years of development, Ming Chuan's campus on Mount Fu was full to capacity. In 1967, the school purchased gently sloping ground in Guishan Township (now Guishan District) of Taoyuan County (now Taoyuan City).

In 1995, at the invitation of the Kinmen County Education Advancement Investigation Team, Ming Chuan established a campus in Kinmen, thus becoming a comprehensive university with three campuses. Success at Kinmen led the Ministry of Education to approve MCU's establishment of Matsu Executive Master's Programs to promote higher education in Kinmen and Matsu and further Pao's dream “to serve the island residents”, recognizing the right of all to an education.

In 2011, the university began holding an annual International Student Paper Competition sponsored by Taiwan ICDF, and finalist papers are published in the Journal of International Cooperation.

With the introduction of  ICDF (International Corporation and Development Fund) scholarships, the university has become known for its large international population. Ming Chuan opened its Michigan Campus at Saginaw Valley State University in 2014.

Mascot
The university's mascot is a whale.

Emblem and flag 
The university flag, like the flag of Taiwan, is red, white, and blue. The emblem follows the color of the flag, with an ascending eagle and three curved figures from the bottom to the top.

Academic Rankings

Academic program overview
          
Management
Tourism
Law
Education & Applied Languages
 
Communication
Information Technology
Design
 
Social Science
Health Technology
International College

Notable alumni
 Aggie Hsieh (謝沛恩), entertainer
 Bryan Chang, actor
 Cheng Hsiao-tse (程孝澤), director of the movie 「渺渺」 (Miao Miao)
 Lee Wo-shih, Magistrate of Kinmen County (2009-2014)
 Margaret Huang (黃麗燕), CEO of Leo Burnett Group Taiwan
 Megan Lai, actress and singer
 Tina Pan, Member of the Legislative Yuan (1993-2002, 2005–2016)
 Namewee (黃明志), Rapper, singer-songwriter, record producer, filmmaker, actor (1983-)

See also
 List of universities in Taiwan
U12 Consortium

References

External links

Ming Chuan University website

 
1957 establishments in Taiwan
Educational institutions established in 1957
Universities and colleges in Taiwan
Universities and colleges in Taipei
Comprehensive universities in Taiwan